Farm to Market Road 4 (FM 4) is a farm to market road in the U.S. state of Texas, maintained by the Texas Department of Transportation (TxDOT), that runs between the cities of Grandview and Jacksboro. The route was designated in March 1942. , FM 4 is one of the longest Farm to Market Roads in the state of Texas.

Route description
The southern terminus of FM 4 is at Texas State Highway 81 (SH 81) in Grandview. FM 4 proceeds through the city and passes the Grandview Cemetery. It then passes through several small communities, including Sand Flat, before reaching the city of Cleburne, where it has a concurrency with SH 171/SH 174. FM 4 passes Cleburne Municipal Airport before exiting the city at its junction with US 67. It then proceeds through Acton, Granbury, Lipan, Santo, and Palo Pinto before reaching its northern terminus in Jacksboro.

History
The route was designated on March 26, 1942, between Santo and U.S. Highway 80, replacing Spur 40. The route was extended north to the end of FM 130 in Lone Camp on July 11, 1945. The route was extended to U.S. Highway 180 on September 6, 1945, replacing FM 130. The route was extended southeast to Granbury on October 23, 1949, replacing FM 7.  On February 6, 1953, the route had been extended north to a road intersection south of the Brazos River, replacing FM 1193. On October 7, 1955, the route had been extended north across the river to Graford, replacing FM 1194. On December 20, 1984, when the district combined several farm to market roads with other ones, FM 4 was extended north to Jacksboro, replacing FM 206. On February 25, 1985, an amendment to the previous request, FM 4 was extended south to then U.S. Highway 81 (now SH 81) at Grandview, replacing FM 208 and FM 110.

The Honda Sport Touring Association has named the section between Palo Pinto and Granbury, through the Palo Pinto Mountains, one of Texas' top ten roads for riding enjoyment and scenery.

Major intersections

Note that the total mileage when listed by junctions does not agree with the total mileage certified by the Texas Department of Transportation because the number given by TxDOT does not include concurrencies.

References

0004
Transportation in Johnson County, Texas
Transportation in Hood County, Texas
Transportation in Palo Pinto County, Texas
Transportation in Jack County, Texas